John Balfour, 3rd Lord Balfour of Burleigh (died 1688) was a Scottish nobleman. He was educated in France; and has been traditionally and erroneously styled Covenanter John Balfour, the Covenanter being John Balfour of Kinloch.

Biography
In his youth Balfour went to France for his education. He was wounded there in an "affair of honour" (duel). He returned home through London early in 1649 and married Isabel, daughter of another scion of his house — Sir William Balfour of Pitcullo, Fife, lieutenant of the Tower. The young married pair set off for Scotland in March. They found the father strongly displeased. The displeasure took the preposterous shape of asking the general assembly of the kirk of Scotland to annul the marriage. The petition was quietly shelved. The plea for the dissolution of the tie was "the open wound" he still bore, and which paternal wrath deemed a disqualification for marriage.

Balfour succeeded his father  Robert as Lord Balfour of Burleigh, in 1663. He died in 1688, leaving besides Robert, his heir and successor, two sons and six daughters.

This Lord Balfour of Burleigh has been traditionally styled "Covenanter", which he assuredly never was. On Sir Walter Scott must be laid the blame — if blame it be — by having appropriated the name and designation in his "John Balfour of Burley" in Old Mortality.

John Balfour, the "Covenanter", was historically "of Kinloch", not of Burleigh, and the principal actor in the assassination of Archbishop Sharp in 1679. For this crime his estate was forfeited and a large reward offered for his capture. He fought at Drumclog and at Bothwell Bridge, and is said to have escaped to Holland, and to have there tendered his services to the Prince of Orange.

It is generally supposed that John Balfour of Burley died at sea on a return voyage to Scotland. But in the New Statistical Account of Scotland, under "Roseneath", strong presumptions are stated for believing that he never left Scotland, but found an asylum in the parish of Roseneath, Dumbartonshire, under the wing of the Argyll family. According to this account, having assumed the name of Salter, his descendants continued there for many generations, the last of the family dying in 1815. Scott noted in his Old Mortality that in 1808 a Lieutenant-Colonel Balfour de Burleigh was commandant of the troops of the King of Holland in the West Indies.

Notes

References

Further reading
 Scott's Old Mortality, note 2, 3
 Anderson's Scottish Nation

1688 deaths
17th-century births
Balfour of Burleigh, 3rd Lord
John, 3rd Lord Balfour
Lords Balfour of Burleigh